Red Dirt Girl is the nineteenth studio album by American country artist Emmylou Harris, released on September 12, 2000 by Nonesuch Records. The album was a significant departure for Harris, as eleven of the twelve tracks were written or co-written by her. At the time, she was best known for covering other songwriters' work. Prior to this album, only two of Harris' LPs had more than two of her own compositions (Gliding Bird in 1969, and The Ballad of Sally Rose in 1985). Her next album, Stumble into Grace, was also written by Harris. The album contains "Bang the Drum Slowly", a song Guy Clark helped Harris write as an elegy for her father. The album peaked at number 3 on the Billboard country album charts and won the Grammy Award for Best Contemporary Folk Album in 2001.

Reception

The album was included in the book 1001 Albums You Must Hear Before You Die.

Track listing

Track information and Personnel credits taken from the album's liner notes.

Personnel
1. "The Pearl"
Emmylou Harris: Acoustic guitar
Malcolm Burn: Bass
Ethan Johns: Electric guitar
Daryl Johnson: Drums, bass, percussion, harmony vocals
Buddy Miller: Electric guitar

2. "Michelangelo"
Emmylou Harris: Acoustic guitar
Malcolm Burn: Bass, Drum box programming
Ethan Johns: Electric guitar

3. "I Don't Wanna Talk About It Now"
Emmylou Harris: Acoustic guitar
Malcolm Burn: Piano, electric guitar, tambourine
Jill Cunniff: Electric guitar, bass, harmony vocals
Ethan Johns: Drums
Daryl Johnson: Bass, harmony vocals
Julie Miller: harmony vocals

4. "Tragedy"
Emmylou Harris: Baritone electric Guitar
Malcolm Burn: Piano, 12-string guitar, bass, Fender Rhodes, drum box programming
Ethan Johns: Electric guitar
Daryl Johnson: Chord bass
Buddy Miller: Pedal steel
Patti Scialfa: Duet vocal
Bruce Springsteen: Harmony vocals

5. "Red Dirt Girl"
Emmylou Harris: Acoustic guitar
Malcolm Burn: Bass, electric guitar, drum box programming
Ethan Johns: Omnichord
Daryl Johnson: Percussion, bass pedals
Buddy Miller: Electric guitar

6. "My Baby Needs A Shepherd"
Emmylou Harris: Acoustic guitar
Malcolm Burn: Electric guitar, percussion, dulcimer, drum box programming
Ethan Johns: Baritone electric guitar, percussion
René Coman: Bass
Patty Griffin: Harmony vocals
Daryl Johnson: Baritone acoustic guitar, percussion

7. "Bang The Drum Slowly"
Emmylou Harris: Baritone electric guitar, acoustic guitar
Malcolm Burn: Piano, synth bass, electric guitar
Ethan Johns: EBow
Daryl Johnson: Bass. harmony vocals, percussion

8. "J'Ai Fait Tout"
Malcolm Burn: Acoustic guitar, electric guitar
Jill Cunniff: Bass, harmony vocals, electric guitar
Ethan Johns: Drums
Daryl Johnson: Bass, harmony vocals
Kate McGarrigle: Accordion
Jim Watts: Fender Rhodes

9. "One Big Love"
Malcolm Burn: Bass, 12-string guitar, drum box programming, harmony vocals
John Deaderick: Fender Rhodes
Ethan Johns: Electric guitar, drums
Buddy Miller: Electric guitar, mando guitar
Julie Miller: Harmony vocals
Jill Cunniff: Harmony vocals
Carlo Nuccio: Drums

10. "Hour Of Gold"
Emmylou Harris: Acoustic guitar
Malcolm Burn: Fender Rhodes, synth
Patty Griffin: Harmony vocals
Ethan Johns: Mando cello
Daryl Johnson: Bass

11. "My Antonia"
Emmylou Harris: Baritone electric guitar
Malcolm Burn: Harmonica, acoustic guitar, omnichord, synth bass
Ethans Johns: Acoustic guitar, mando cello
Daryl Johnson: Bass, percussion
Dave Matthews: Duet vocal
Buddy Miller: Pedal steel, electric guitar

12. "Boy From Tupelo"
Emmylou Harris: Acoustic guitar
Malcolm Burn: Bass, percussion, piano, electric guitar, drums
Ethan Johns: EBow, acoustic guitar
Kate McGarrigle: Piano, harmony vocals
Julie Miller: Harmony vocals

Charts

Weekly charts

Year-end charts

References 

Emmylou Harris albums
2000 albums
Grammy Award for Best Contemporary Folk Album
Albums produced by Malcolm Burn
Nonesuch Records albums